Dr. T T Sreekumar is an Indian writer, social and literary critic, and political analyst. He is currently working in The English and Foreign Languages University, Hyderabad as Head of the Department, at the School of Interdisciplinary Studies and also serves as the Director of EMMRC.  He is a bilingual author of several books and articles in Malayalam and English, and pens a fortnightly column since 2014 in Madhyamam.

Education 
Sreekumar did his M.phil. in Applied Economics from Jawaharlal Nehru University, Delhi and his Ph.D. in STS (Science, Technology and Society) from The School of Humanities and Social sciences, Hong Kong University of Science and Technology, Hong Kong.

Career 
Beginning his career as lecturer at Institute of Management in Government, Thiruvananthapuram in 1996, Sreekumar worked as doctoral instructor in HKUST and later joined National University of Singapore as faculty in 2004. He was the Professor and Chair, Fellows program and Digital Communications at MICA, Ahamedabad during 2013-2016. In 2017, he joined The School of Interdisciplinary Studies, English and Foreign Languages University as Professor.

With wide teaching and research experience across South East Asia and South Asia, Sreekumar's papers on Asian modernity, development, e-governance, mobile ecology and rural network societies focus on socio-political critique of information technology and New Media. His book ICTs and Development in India: Perspectives on the Rural Network Society provides a critical analysis of the neoliberal glorification of the notion of ICT4D (Information and communication technologies for development).

Writings 
A prolific writer and columnist in Malayalam, his books include Utharadhunikakkappuram (Beyond Postmodernism), Charitravum Adhunikathayum (History and Modernity), Civil samoohavum idathupakshavum (Civil Society and the Left), Nava Samoohikatha (New Sociality) and Vayanayum Prathirodhavum (Reading and Resistance). The fortnightly column in Madhyamam daily, Naalaam Kannu that he pens, offers critical views on Kerala's sociopolitical contexts. His staunch and direct critique of contemporary politics and culture makes him one among Kerala's prominent intellectual voices. Interviews with him have appeared in major Malayalam periodicals like Mathrubhumi (2012 Annual issue pg6-18) Chandrika (December 2016).He received the C.B.Kumar Endowment Award of Kerala Sahitya Academy for the year 2020 for the book "Vayanayum Prathirodhavum".

List of Books

English
 ICTs and Development in India: Perspectives on the Rural Network Society, London: Anthem Press (2011)
 Urban Process in Kerala: 1900-1981. Thiruvananthapuram, India: Centre for Development Studies, St. Joseph's Press. (1993)

Malayalam
 Posthuman Vichara Lokangal: Shaasthram,Saundaryam,Mruthyu Rashtreeyam (Posthuman Thinking: Science,Aesthetics,Necropolitics), Pustaka Prasadhaka Sangham, Kozhikode (2021). 
   
 Republicinte Sakshathkarangal  (Realizing the Republic). Flame Books, Trissur, 2021.
 Samskarathinte Samaramukhangal (Battlegrounds of Culture). Quivive Text, 2020.
 Samskaravum   (History and Culture). Trivandrum, Bhasha Institute, 2019. 
 Punarvayanakalile Mraxism  (Rereadings of Marxism). Kottayam, D C Books, 2019
 Palaayanangal: Adhiniveshangalum Bhookhandaanthara Raashtreeyavum  (Exodus: Domination and Intercontinental Politics) Kerala: Prasakthi Publications, 2019
 Vayanayum Prathirodhavum ( Reading and Resistance)  Kozhikkode: Olive Publications, (2017)
 Navasamoohikatha: Sasthram, Charithram, Rashtreeyam ( New Sociality: Science, History and Politics)  Pratheeksha Books, Kozhikkode (2011)
 Civil Samoohavum Idathupakshavum (Civil Society and the Left) Olive Publications, Kozhikkode (2007)
 Kadalarivukal  (Sea lores) D C Books, Kottayam, (2004)
 Katha Ithu vare: Kerala Vikasana Samvadangal ( The Story till now: Debates on development, Kerala) D C Books (2003)
 Charithravum Adhunikathayum ( History and Modernity) Current Books, Kottayam (2001)
 Utharadhunikathakkappuram  (Beyond Post modernism) D C Books, Kottayam (2000)
 Krishi Geetha: Chollum Vayanayum. (Krishi Geetha: Text and Readings)  Nattariv Padana Kendram, Thrissur (1999)
 Aanava Nilayavum Vikasana Rashtreeyavum (Nuclear Reactors and Developmental Politics)  Samoohika Padana Kendram, Alappuzha.(1991)

Sreekumar's contribution toward the sociopolitical critique of Information technology in Asia and the critical positions are propounded in his book ICTs and Development: Perspectives on the Rural Network Society (Anthem Books, 2011). He has also been the Chief Editor (2013-2017) of Journal of Creative Communications (peer reviewed, international Sage Publication), and the Associate Editor (2014-2019) of Media Asia (Taylor & Francis). He is currently the editor of International Journal of Media Studies, published by EFL University. He also serves as a member of the editorial board and as a manuscript reviewer for several other prominent journals.

References 

Malayali people
Malayalam-language writers
Living people
Academic staff of the English and Foreign Languages University
Indian literary critics
Year of birth missing (living people)
Academic staff of the National University of Singapore